Campo dei Fiori may refer to:

 Campo de' Fiori, a square in Rome
 Campo de' fiori (The Peddler and the Lady), a 1943 Italian film
 Campo dei Fiori di Varese, a mountain in Italy